Jia is the pinyin romanization of a Chinese name. Chia is the corresponding Wade-Giles romanization that is used Taiwan. Ka is the Cantonese-based romanization  used in Hong Kong, Macao and other and other areas of Southeastern China.

Notable people with Jia as a given name

Historical figures
Jia of Wei (魏王假) (died 225 BC?), the last ruler of Wei during the Warring States Period
Jia of Zhao (赵王嘉) (reigned 227–223 BCE), the last ruler of Zhao during the Warring States Period
Wang Jia (拾遺記) was a Chinese Taoist hermit and scholar.
Qin Jia (c. first century B.C. – first century A.D.) (秦嘉) was a Chinese poet of the Eastern Han dynasty.

Politics
Li Jia (born 1961) (李佳)  male Chinese politician, Deputy Communist Party Secretary of Inner Mongolia
Li Jia (born 1964) (李嘉) male Chinese politician, former Communist Party Secretary of Zhuhai
Li Jia (born 1966) (李佳) female Chinese politician, former Party Secretary of Ziyang, Sichuan
Hu Jia (activist) (born 1973) (胡佳) Chinese pro-democracy and HIV/AIDS activist

Sports
Li Jia (table tennis), (李佳) (born 1981) female table tennis player, peak of career from 2000 to 2003
Liu Jia (刘佳) is a female Chinese-born table tennis player who now represents Austria.
Hu Jia (diver) (胡佳) (born 1983), Chinese Olympic diver
Qi Jia is a female (齐佳) Chinese ice dancer. 
Tian Jia (田佳) is a female Chinese professional beach volleyball player.
Pan Jia (潘佳) is a Chinese footballer.

Cinema
Li Jia (李柯竺), Chinese actress who appeared in The Park (2007 film)
Liu Jia (Chinese: 刘佳; born 16 February 1982 in Beijing, China) is a female Chinese-born table tennis player who now represents Austria.
Song Jia (actress, born 1962) (宋佳), Chinese actress
Song Jia (actress, born 1980) (宋佳), Chinese actress and singer

Music
Meng Jia (孟佳) Chinese singer mostly active in South Korea and China.

References

Chinese given names